The Eskridge Shale or Eskridge Formation is an Early Permian geologic formation in Kansas. Its outcrop runs north–south through Kansas, extending into Oklahoma and Nebraska. While named a shale, it features extensive, spectacular red and green stacked palosol mudstones, these mudstones showing prominent vertical tubular carbonate concretions, possibly from roots or vertebrate burrows.

See also

 List of fossiliferous stratigraphic units in Kansas
 Paleontology in Kansas

References

Permian Kansas